Tatiana Grigorievna Anodina (born April 16, 1939 in Leningrad). From 1991 to 2023, she headed of the Interstate Aviation Committee — the civil aviation oversight body in Russia and some other states of the former Soviet Union. A career aviation engineer, she has been leading the Committee since its foundation in 1991.

Anodina's son and his family owned and controlled Transaero, one of Russia's largest airlines until its demise in October 2015. There had been press speculation regarding Anodina's conflict of interest in certifying aircraft with respect to Transaero's market position.

Biography
Anodina was born on 16 April 1939 in Leningrad (then Soviet Union) to a family of a Soviet Air Forces pilot. She graduated from the Lviv Polytechnic Institute in 1961, qualifying as an engineer. After graduation she worked in the civil aviation domain. Her first job was with the State Institute of Civil Aviation, the leading research institution in Soviet Union in the field. She made her career at the institute, working on automatic systems of navigation, and was eventually appointed the director. In the 1970s, she was transferred to the Ministry of Civil Aviation, where she became director of the technical division.

She married Pyotr Pleshakov (a Soviet military engineer, who was later promoted to Colonel General, and then was the Soviet Union's Minister of Radioelectronic Industry from 1974 till 1987.)

From 1991 to 2023, she was held the position of chairperson of the Interstate Aviation Committee.

Degrees and awards
Tatiana Anodina holds a degree of Doctor of technical sciences and is an author of over 100 research papers on aeronautical engineering specializing in communications. In 1979, Anodina was awarded, along with other researchers, a State Prize of the Soviet Union for the development of a novel radar systems for air traffic control.

In 1997, Anodina received the Edward Warner Award from ICAO "in recognition of her eminent contribution, as scientist and researcher, to the development of national, regional and global air navigation aids for civil aviation at the international level"

In January 2023, the title of honorary President of the Council for Aviation and the Use of Airspace with the right of advisory vote was proposed.

Notes

External links
Пресс-конференция представителей Межгосударственного авиационного комитета - transcript of Anodina's 2011 interview for the Echo Moskvy 

1939 births
20th-century Russian engineers
Living people
Engineers from Saint Petersburg
Lviv Polytechnic alumni
Chevaliers of the Légion d'honneur
Honoured Scientists of the Russian Federation
Recipients of the Order "For Merit to the Fatherland", 3rd class
Recipients of the Order of Honour (Moldova)
Recipients of the Order of Merit (Ukraine), 3rd class
Recipients of the Order of the Red Banner of Labour
Recipients of the Shohrat Order
Recipients of the USSR State Prize
Russian aerospace engineers
Soviet aerospace engineers